The Iraqi Super Cup, previously called Iraqi Perseverance Cup, is Iraqi football's annual match contested between the champions of the previous Iraqi Premier League season and the holders of the Iraq FA Cup. If the Premier League champions also won the FA Cup then the league runners-up provide the opposition. The fixture is a recognised football super cup. Extra-time is not played in the case of a draw; the game goes straight to penalties instead.

The current holders are Al-Shorta, who defeated Al-Karkh 1–0 in the 2022 match.

History
Before 1973, league tournaments in Iraq were played at a regional level and there was a cup called the Iraq Central FA Perseverance Cup played between the winners and runners-up of the Iraq Central FA League. Twelve years after the foundation of the Iraqi Premier League, the Perseverance Cup was played as a national tournament for the first time, and it was between Al-Talaba and Al-Rasheed, the winners and runners-up of the 1985–86 Iraqi National League.

It took another eleven years for the tournament to resume, returning in 1997 as a match between the winners of the Iraqi Premier League and the Iraq FA Cup. The 1997 and 1998 editions were played at the end of the season to bring a close to the campaign, but from 1999 onwards, the cup was played before the start of the following Premier League season as a 'curtain-raiser' to the new league campaign.

From the 2003–04 season until the 2014–15 season, the Iraq FA Cup was either not played or not completed. It was finally completed in 2015–16, and therefore the Iraqi Perseverance Cup under the new name of Iraqi Super Cup was scheduled to be played in August of that year, but it was cancelled due to scheduling difficulties. The Iraqi Super Cup eventually returned in 2017.

Rules
The rules of the Super Cup are generally the same as those of the Premier League, with a team of 11 starting players and 9 substitutes, with five substitutions permitted. If the scores are level after 90 minutes, the teams play a penalty shootout. If a team wins both the Premier League and the FA Cup, the runner-up from the Premier League will play.

Statistics

Matches

Most successful clubs

List of winning managers

References

External links
 Iraq Football Association

 
Football competitions in Iraq
Iraq